North Carrollton/Frankford station is a DART Light Rail station in Carrollton, Texas. The station opened as part of the Green Line's expansion in December 2010 and is the northern terminus of the line.

References

External links 
Dallas Area Rapid Transit - North Carrollton/Frankford Station

Dallas Area Rapid Transit light rail stations
Railway stations in the United States opened in 2010
Railway stations in Denton County, Texas